The men's 400 metres event  at the 2001 IAAF World Indoor Championships was held on March 9–11.

Medalists

Results

Heats
The first two of each heat (Q) and the next 2 fastest (q) qualified for the semifinals.

Semifinals
First 3 of each semifinal (Q) qualified directly for the final.

Final

References
Results

400
400 metres at the World Athletics Indoor Championships